Nancy Taira (born Nancy Fabiola Saori Taira Yshizo; November 10, 1977 in Mexico City, Mexico) is a Mexican actress.

Background
Taira's parents are both Japanese. Before enrolling and studying for three years in Televisa's Centro de Educación Artística (CEA) where she studied acting, she received a Bachelor's Degree in Communications.

Career
Taira debuted as an actress in Mujer, Casos de la Vida Real and obtained her first major role in Corazones al límite, where she played Coral, one of the stellar characters in the telenovela. She later played a small role in Yo amo a Juan Querendon. Her latest appearance was in the Mexican series El Pantera, where she played Ana.
She starred in 2011 the Telenovela Una familia con suerte.

Filmography

References

External links
 

1977 births
Mexican people of Japanese descent
Mexican actresses
Actresses from Mexico City
21st-century Mexican actresses
Actresses of Japanese descent
Living people